VNM may refer to:
Vietnam
Von Neumann–Morgenstern utility theorem
Vadodara News Magazine
VNM (rapper), Polish hip hop artist (pl)